The 73rd Indianapolis 500 was held at the Indianapolis Motor Speedway in Speedway, Indiana on Sunday, May 28, 1989. Two-time World Drivers' Champion Emerson Fittipaldi of Brazil became the first foreign-born winner of the race since 1969, and first non-American winner since 1966. Though Fittipaldi started on the front row and dominated much of the race, he found himself running second in the waning laps. Michael Andretti passed Fittipaldi for the lead on lap 154, then led until his engine blew. Al Unser Jr. moved up to second, but trailed Fittipaldi by a big margin. Gambling on fuel mileage, Unser Jr. caught up to Fittipaldi after a fortuitous caution period on lap 181, and subsequently took the lead on lap 196.

On the 199th lap, Al Unser Jr. was leading Emerson Fittipaldi, at which time the two leaders encountered slower traffic. Down the backstretch, Unser and Fittipaldi weaved through the slower cars, then Fittipaldi dived underneath going into turn three. The two cars touched wheels, and Unser spun out, crashing into the outside retaining wall. Fittipaldi completed the final lap under caution behind the pace car to score his first of two Indy 500 victories. Unser was uninjured, and despite the crash, was still credited with second place.

Race winner Emerson Fittipaldi set a new record and reached a significant milestone, becoming the first Indy 500 winner to earn a one million dollar single-race prize money purse. His prize money officially totaled $1,001,600.

After dominating the 1988 month of May, all three cars of the Penske Team failed to finish the race in 1989. Danny Sullivan suffered a broken arm in a practice crash, and mechanical failures sidelined all three cars on race day. It was the only year in the decade of the 1980s, and the first time since 1976, that the Penske team failed to score a top five finish. Ironically, race winner Emerson Fittipaldi (driving for rival Patrick Racing) was fielding a Penske PC-18 chassis, acquired from Penske in a special arrangement between the two teams.

The race was sanctioned by USAC, and was included as part of the 1989 CART PPG Indy Car World Series. At season's end, Fittipaldi became the fourth driver since 1979 to win the Indy 500 and CART championship in the same season. The win was also Patrick Racing's third and final Indy victory. Former driver Chip Ganassi, who had become a co-owner at Patrick Racing in 1989, enjoyed his first of six Indy wins (as of 2022) as a car owner or co-owner.

Background and offseason

Track improvements
Speedway management resurfaced the entire track with asphalt during the summer of 1988, which would result in higher overall speeds for 1989. The last time the track had been repaved was in 1976. The apron at the bottom of the track (typically used for warm-up and cool-down laps, as well as an escape lane for slowing cars), which was previously known to be bumpy, relatively flat, and usually avoided by drivers, was also repaved. The racing surface was separated from the apron by a painted white line. The smooth and re-profiled apron was now tempting drivers to dip below the white line in practice and during the race. Drivers were starting to treat the apron as an extension of the track width. USAC announced penalties would be assessed for driving with four wheels below the white line excessively, other than to make routine passes in heavy traffic.

The rough and bumpy concrete pit lane was also paved over in asphalt and a guardrail was installed to protect the crew members in the sign board area. The newly paved pit area made egress and ingress to the pits smoother and safer, but also sharply increased entrance and exit speeds, potentially putting crew members at risk. Within a few years, after a succession of incidents on the Indy car circuit, as well as in NASCAR, pit road speed limits would be implemented to curtail excessive speeding through the pit lane. In addition the pneumatic jacks built into the cars were found to be embedding themselves into the soft asphalt of the pit lane. This necessitated crews to affix steel plates on the pit lane to accommodate the jacks (a practice that was also later deemed unsafe). In 1994, this would be finally be solved when the individual pit boxes were resurfaced in concrete.

Rule changes
Goodyear arrived at the track providing both a hard and soft compound tire. The exclusive tire provider spent the off-season developing new tires that were better-suited to the newly repaved track. Teams were permitted to run either compound at any time, however, they were required to start the race on the same tires that they used during time trials. All teams qualified on the soft compounds, thus all were required to start the race on soft compounds. Teams electing to switch to hard compound tires for the race could do so on their first pit stop.

Team and driver changes

Team and driver changes were highlighted by Bobby Rahal's departure from Truesports. For 1989, Rahal switched to the Maurice Kranes Kraco Racing Team (A year later, the team would merge with Galles). Rahal, along with Arie Luyendyk at Dick Simon Racing, fielded the new Cosworth DFS "short stroke", and updated version of the mainstay DFV. However, Rahal's DFS engine blew during Carburetion Day practice, and for race day the team would have to revert to a previous generation DFX.

Rookie Scott Pruett, the IMSA GTO and SCCA Trans-Am champion, moved to the Indy car ranks, and took over the vacated seat at Truesports. The team would continue to field the Judd powerplant. After a noteworthy 6th-place performance in the 1988 race, Jim Crawford was back at King Racing.

Patrick Racing was once again a one-car effort for 1989, after periodically running two cars in previous seasons. Pat Patrick had announced that he was planning to retire after the 1989 season, and Chip Ganassi joined the team as co-owner. After the season, Ganassi would take over the team and it would become Chip Ganassi Racing. As part of the arrangement, the Marlboro-sponsored Patrick Racing would run Penske chassis (PC-18), while Penske Racing would receive sponsorship money from Marlboro to run a third car for Al Unser Sr.

Newman Haas Racing also made headlines, expanding to a two-car team for 1989. Mario Andretti was joined by his son Michael to form a two-car Andretti effort. It was also Michael's first opportunity to field the Chevrolet engine. Michael had previously driven for the Kraco Racing Team.

Alfa Romeo joined the CART series with Alex Morales Motorsports in 1989. However, they were not yet ready to compete at Indianapolis. Their debut would actually come a couple weeks later at Detroit. As a result, driver Roberto Guerrero would miss the Indy 500 for the first time since he arrived as a rookie in 1984.

Absent from the race as a driver was Dick Simon, who retired at the end of the 1988 season. Simon had been a participant at Indy since 1970, but was still entered as owner of Dick Simon Racing.

Race schedule

Practice – week 1

Saturday May 6
Opening day was Saturday May 6. Only eleven cars took to the track on a cold 45 °F day, which saw snow flurries in the morning and the afternoon. Arie Luyendyk (213.657 mph) led the speed chart for the day.

Sunday May 7
Practice picked up on Sunday May 7, with 44 cars taking to the track. Emerson Fittipaldi (221.347 mph) set the fastest lap of practice thus far. Michael Andretti was also over 220 mph.

Monday May 8
Rick Mears set an all-time unofficial track record at 225.733 mph, the first ever practice lap over 225 mph at the Speedway. His teammate Al Unser was close behind at 224.831 mph.

Tuesday May 9
Rain washed out practice.

Wednesday May 10
Rookie Steve Butler crashed in turn 4, suffering a broken collarbone, sidelining him for the month. The speeds were slightly down from Monday, with Al Unser topping the chart at 223.380 mph.

Thursday May 11
At 4:11 p.m. on Thursday May 11, Danny Sullivan's car lost the engine cover, causing him to break into a 180° spin in turn three. The car hit the wall hard with the right side. Sullivan suffered a mild concussion and a fractured right arm. Sullivan would be forced to sit out the first weekend of time trials. High winds kept the speeds down, with Jim Crawford in a Buick V-6 (221.021 mph) the best lap of the day.

Friday May 12
Rick Mears blistered the track on the final day of practice before time trials. His lap of 226.231 mph was the fastest practice lap ever run at the Speedway. Jim Crawford and Al Unser also topped 225 mph. Mears finished the week as the favorite for the pole position.

Time trials – first weekend

Saturday May 13
Pole day was scheduled for Saturday May 13. Rain, however, washed out the entire day. All time trial activities were postponed until Sunday.

Sunday May 14 – Pole day
On Sunday May 14, pole day time trials were held. Per USAC rules at the time, the cars would be allowed one trip through the qualifying draw order, and the pole round would be concluded. Al Unser Sr. drew first in line, and was the first driver to make an attempt. Unser set a track record on all four laps, and put himself on the provisional pole position with a track record run of 223.471 mph.

A busy hour of qualifying saw several cars complete runs. Scott Brayton, Scott Pruett, Bernard Jourdain, Teo Fabi, and Michael Andretti were among those who completed runs. Bobby Rahal and A. J. Foyt followed, and the field was already filled to eleven cars by 1:30 p.m.

At 2 p.m., Mario Andretti (220.486 mph) tentatively put himself third. The next car out, however, was pole favorite Rick Mears. Mears set a one-lap track record of 224.254 mph, and a four-lap record of 223.885 mph to secure the pole position. Minutes later, it was announced that Michael Andretti's car failed post-qualifying inspection. His run was disallowed as the car found to be 4.5 pounds underweight.

With Mears and Unser Sr. firmly holding the top two spots, the rest of the session focused on which driver would round out the front row in third starting position. Jim Crawford, in the Buick V-6, set a stock block track record of 221.450 mph to sit in third at 2:40 p.m. Twenty minutes later, though, Emerson Fittipaldi took to the track, the final car eligible for the pole round. His run of 222.329 mph put him on the outside of the front row, and bumped Crawford back to the inside of row two.

After the pole position round was settled, the "Second Day" of time trials commenced at 3:15 p.m. Second day qualifiers would line up behind the first day qualifiers. Michael Andretti re-qualified at 218.774 mph (the 8th fastest car in the field), but was forced to start 22nd as a second-day qualifier. Andretti complained he could not get to the proper level of turbocharger boost due a possibly malfunctioning pop-off valve, but USAC took no action. Tom Sneva had an impressive first lap of 223.176 mph, but blew his engine before the run was completed. At the end of the day, the field was filled to 26 cars.

Practice – week 2
Practice during the second week was light, with many qualified drivers practicing in back-up cars. Most of the focus was on the non-qualified drivers, and the recovery status of Danny Sullivan. The Penske Team started preparing a back-up machine for Sullivan, with Geoff Brabham selected to shake the car down.

Danny Sullivan returned to the cockpit on Thursday May 18. He completed about 10-12 hot laps, with a top speed of 213.118 mph. Jim Crawford crashed his already-qualified car in turn 3. A suspension piece broke as he entered the turn, and the car spun into the outside wall. The team would repair the machine.

Rain washed out practice on "Fast" Friday May 19, the third day overall lost during the month.

Time trials – second weekend

Third Day time trials – Saturday May 20
On the third day of time trials, Danny Sullivan qualified comfortably at 216.027 mph. Sullivan was the fastest car of the day, followed by Kevin Cogan and Rocky Moran. Two crashes occurred during the day, involving Buddy Lazier and Steve Saleen. Neither would manage to qualify. At the end of the third day, the field was filled to 31 cars.

Bump Day time trials – Sunday May 21
On Bump Day, much of the attention was focused on three-time Indy winner Johnny Rutherford, the biggest name who had not yet qualified. As the day opened, Billy Vukovich III (216.698 mph) put his car in the field with an impressive run, ranked 16th-fastest overall. The second car to qualify was Johnny Rutherford, who completed his run at 213.097 mph. The field was now filled to 33 cars. Davy Jones (211.475 mph) was the slowest car in the field, and now on the bubble.

John Paul Jr. bumped Davy Jones out of the field at 12:45 p.m. Paul was attempting to make a return to Indy after a four-year absence. His career was interrupted in 1986 when he was sentenced to five years in prison for his involvement in a drug trafficking ring with his father (John Paul Sr.) and subsequently refused to testify against him. He served a total of thirty months, being released in October 1988. Though tentatively in the field, Paul himself was now sitting on the bubble in 33rd at 211.969 mph.

The track activity went quiet during the heat of the afternoon. At 3 p.m., Davy Jones returned to the track and bumped his way back into the field with a run at 214.279 mph. That move put Phil Krueger (212.458 mph) on the bubble. At 4:45 p.m., Pancho Carter bumped out Krueger. At that point, Johnny Rutherford (213.097 mph) had now slipped down to the bubble spot.

Rutherford survived three attempts, and clung to the bubble spot nervously over the next hour. During that time, he put together a last-minute deal to step into a Foyt back-up car if necessary. He shook down the car with some practice laps, and appeared to be finding some speed. It was the second time in recent years that Rutherford was teaming up with Foyt on Bump Day. In 1984 Rutherford successfully bumped his way into the field with a Foyt backup car in the last ten minutes of time trials.

With fifteen minutes left in the day, Rich Vogler (213.239 mph) bumped Johnny Rutherford from the field. Rutherford scrambled to get in line, and made it to the front with less than two minutes to spare. With the crowd cheering him on, at 5:58 p.m., Rutherford pulled out onto the track for one final attempt. He had a great warm-up lap of over 217 mph, but just after he took the green flag, his engine blew in turn one. Seconds later, the 6 o'clock gun went off. Rutherford failed to make the field for only the second time in his career. Rookie Bernard Jourdain held on to the final bubble spot, and the field was set.

Starting grid
 = Indianapolis 500 rookie,  = Former Indianapolis 500 winner

Alternates
First alternate: Johnny Rutherford  (#98/#14T) – Bumped
Second alternate: Phil Krueger (#77) – Bumped

Failed to Qualify
John Paul Jr. (#39/#79/#97) – Bumped
Michael Greenfield  (#17/#63) – failed to qualify; wave off
Tony Bettenhausen Jr. (#17/#24) – failed to qualify; wave off
Steve Butler  (#61) – crashed in practice
Buddy Lazier (#35) – crashed in practice
Steve Saleen  (#59) – crashed in practice
Johnny Parsons (#59/#69) – crashed in practice
Scott Harrington (#44) – practiced, did not attempt to qualify
Tom Bigelow (#66) – practiced, did not attempt to qualify
Stan Fox (#84) – practiced, did not attempt to qualify
Steve Chassey (#79, #97) – practiced, did not attempt to qualify
Dale Coyne  (#39) – practiced, did not attempt to qualify
Dick Ferguson (#47) – did not take practice
Bobby Olivero – unknown

Race summary

Start
During one of the parade laps, veteran Gary Bettenhausen suffered a broken valve, and coasted to a stop on the mainstretch. He would be wheeled to the garage area without completing a single lap, and finished 33rd.

At the start, Emerson Fittipaldi jumped to the lead from the outside of the front row. He pulled out to a sizable lead over the first few laps. On the third lap, Kevin Cogan had a spectacular crash at the pit-entrance section of the front straightaway. His car made slight contact with the outside wall as he exited turn four, spun to the inside and made heavy contact with the inside pit wall. The car rebounded into the attenuating barrier at the pit entrance (also breaking the ABC Sports robo camera at the pit road entry), broke in two pieces, and slid on its side through the pits. The engine completely separated from the remains of the car and came to a stop in the pit area. Amazingly, Cogan climbed out unhurt.

Mid race
The race was dominated by Emerson Fittipaldi for the first 400 miles.  During that stretch, several contenders retired due to mechanical failures, including all three Penske machines. Top-five contenders Bobby Rahal, Jim Crawford, and Arie Luyendyk also dropped out of the race.  Mario Andretti experienced electrical problems, which caused him to lose significant ground to the leader. Michael Andretti, who had started in the seventh row, had been chasing Fittipaldi the entire race and by the 150-lap mark, he was within sights of the leader. Meanwhile, Al Unser Jr. remained on the lead lap in third place, despite being lapped earlier in the race. By this point, the three leaders had significant distance on the fourth place car of Raul Boesel. With less than 100 miles to go, Michael Andretti passed Fittipaldi for the lead, but his engine expired a few laps later. Fittipaldi regained the lead, with Al Unser Jr. second. The remainder of the field ran at least six laps behind.

A caution came out on lap 181 when Tero Palmroth lost a wheel in turn four. Leader Fittipaldi pitted for much-needed fuel, but he nearly stalled his engine as he pulled away. He lost several seconds on the stop, and was also blocked momentarily by a safety truck as he exited the pit area. Al Unser Jr. was running a distant second place, but the caution came partly to his advantage. On the previous rounds of pit stops, Unser Jr. had been experiencing slightly better fuel mileage than Fittipaldi. The team had been setting Unser up to potentially make it to the finish on one less pit stop than Fittipaldi. Under this late yellow, the team decided to gamble on track position, and Unser stayed out and did not to pit for fuel. Unser emerged just one car behind Fittipaldi. Team owner Rick Galles made the call not to pit – their fuel calculations were close enough that believed they could make it to the finish. Their reasoning was that even if Unser ran out of fuel on the final lap, they would still finish no worse than second since third place Raul Boesel was six laps behind.

Finish
When the race restarted on lap 186, Fittipaldi quickly built a 3-second lead while Unser struggled to get around the lapped car of Raul Boesel (3rd place). Boesel's car was spewing fluid, and appeared ready to blow. After clearing Boesel, Unser began closing dramatically. By lap 193 he was directly behind Fittipaldi, and a lap later he nearly touched wheels with him as the two drivers worked around the lapped cars of Derek Daly and Mario Andretti and battled for the lead. On lap 196, Unser passed Fittipaldi for the lead in turn three and began to pull away. Unser's light fuel load made him much faster on the straights but there was still considerable fear he might run out of fuel short of the finish line.

With two laps to go, Unser approached a line of slower cars consisting of Rocky Moran, Ludwig Heimrath Jr., Bernard Jourdain and John Jones. The two leaders were able to get around Moran easily in turn one, but Unser was held up behind Heimrath through turn two, allowing Fittipaldi to close in rapidly. On the backstretch, Fittipaldi pulled inside Unser, who then cut to the inside to pass Heimrath. Both cars ran side-by-side down the backstretch, going 3-wide to pass Jourdain on the inside as they entered turn 3. Unser remained on the racing line, with Fittipaldi down low on the warm-up apron. Near the apex of the corner, Fittipaldi's car oversteered and drifted slightly up the track, and the two cars touched wheels. Unser spun and crashed hard into the turn three wall, while Fittipaldi recovered from the drift and continued on. The yellow flag came out for the last lap with Fittpaldi leading, cruising around on his way to certain victory.

Unser emerged from his crashed car unhurt and stepped to the edge of the track to gesture at Fittipaldi as he drove by. According to Unser, at the last second he reconsidered and gave Fittipaldi a sporting thumbs-up instead, but some viewers interpreted his gesture as a mocking one. The pace car escorted the field around the final corner, and for the second year in a row, the race finished under caution. Emerson Fittipaldi took the checkered flag, his first of two Indy 500 victories. Despite the crash Unser was still credited with second place, having completed four more laps than Boesel in third. Boesel managed to nurse his failing motor to the checkered flag. The third place was his best Indy finish, and best finish to-date for Shierson Racing.

Fittipaldi's win was well-received by the Indy car community. Fittipaldi also spoke, in his native Portuguese, a greeting to the people in Brazil in victory lane, to the thunderous roars of the crowd. Al Unser Jr., after being checked out and released from the track hospital, congratulated his adversary on the win, and rejected theories that Fittipaldi intentionally crashed him in response to their previous year's tangle at the Meadowlands.

Box score

Race statistics

Quotes
"They're side-by-side, Emmo on the inside, Al covered traffic goes high, they touched wheels, Al Jr. hit into the wall hard, Emerson Fittipaldi keeps on going, they touched wheels, Al Jr. into the wall and Emerson Fittipaldi will lead them back to the yellow flag." – Larry Henry described the crash involving Al Unser Jr. and Emerson Fittipaldi on Lap 198 for the Indianapolis Motor Speedway Radio Network.

"Fittipaldi comes inside Little Al!  A drag race on the back side again. … Slower traffic moves to the right. … Can Fittipaldi get past?  Little Al brings it down low. … They touch!  Little Al into the wall, Fittipaldi continues on! Little Al slams the wall, as Emerson Fittipaldi screams toward the white flag!" – Paul Page on ABC television.

Broadcasting

Radio
The race was carried live on the IMS Radio Network. Lou Palmer served as the chief announcer for the second and final time. It would be Palmer's 32nd and final 500 as part of the radio crew. Bob Forbes reported from victory lane.

One of the more significant changes involved Howdy Bell, now becoming the "elder statesman" of the crew. After many years in turn two, then one year as a pit reporter, Bell revived the backstretch reporting location. Bell was utilized sparingly, mostly for observations and brief commentary. The on-air "Statistician" duty was eliminated for 1989. This would be Bob Lamey's last year in turn two, and Bob Jenkins' final year as the radio reporter in turn four.

The biggest departure for 1989 was that of pit reporter Luke Walton, who had joined the crew in the mid-1950s. From 1983 to 1988, Walton reprised his traditional role of introducing the starting command during the pre-race ceremonies, but did not have an active role during the race itself. Pit reporter Gary Gerould took over the duty of introducing the starting command, but it would be the final time that was done on the radio broadcast. Starting in 1990, the radio would instead simulcast the public address system during the pre-race ceremonies. This was Gerould's last year on the radio broadcast. He would work the TV broadcast starting in 1990. In addition, Chuck Marlowe switched from pit reporter to the garage area duties.

Three-time Indy winner Johnny Rutherford failed to qualify for the race, and joined the crew as "driver expert." Since Rutherford never again qualified for the race (and subsequently retired in 1994), he went on to become a long-time fixture on the broadcast. The 1989 race began what would be a 14-year run for Rutherford as the resident "driver expert."

After the race, during the off-season, the Speedway and Lou Palmer parted ways. A new Voice of the 500 would debut in 1990, along with many other changes.

Television
The race was carried live flag-to-flag coverage in the United States on ABC Sports. The 1989 race celebrated the 25th year of the Indy 500 on ABC. Paul Page served as host and play-by-play announcer, accompanied by Bobby Unser and Sam Posey. At the start of the race, Unser drove the pace car, and reported live from the car during the pace laps.

Pit reporters Jack Arute and Brian Hammons were joined by Dr. Jerry Punch, who appeared at Indy for the first time.

The telecast would go on to win the Sports Emmy award for "Outstanding Live Sports Special."

Gallery

Notes

References

Works cited
 1989 Indianapolis 500 Day-By-Day Trackside Report For the Media
 Indianapolis 500 History: Race & All-Time Stats – Official Site
 1989 Indianapolis 500 Radio Broadcast, Indianapolis Motor Speedway Radio Network

External links
 Gallery of photos from the event, official website of the Indianapolis 500
 Part 6: 1989 – Winning major prizes on the road to losing everything

Indianapolis 500 races
Indianapolis 500
Indianapolis 500
Indianapolis 500